Pseudodyscrasis is a genus of picture-winged flies in the family Ulidiidae.

Species
Pseudodyscrasis scutellaris (Wiedemann, 1830)

References

Ulidiidae
Monotypic Brachycera genera
Endemic insects of Mexico
Diptera of North America
Brachycera genera